Ålsheia is the biggest ski area at Sirdal   in Vest-Agder  Norway. It is located about  40 km from Tonstad.

Facilities
It has skiing for all abilities from pro to amateur. It has 2 T-bar lifts, 4 button lifts, and one belt lift. They have  2 parks, one halfpipe and tre cornes.

External links
Official website

Ski areas and resorts in Norway